Matthew Edward Butler (born June 10, 1999) is an American football defensive tackle for the Las Vegas Raiders of the National Football League (NFL). He played college football at Tennessee.

High school career
Butler attended Garner Magnet High School in Garner, North Carolina. As a senior, he had 96 tackles and 26 sacks. He committed to the University of Tennessee to play college football.

College career
Butler played at Tennessee from 2017 to 2021 under head coaches Butch Jones, Jeremy Pruitt, and Josh Heupel. During his career he played in 52 games with 25 starts and had 152 tackles and 9.5 sacks.

Professional career

Butler was drafted by the Las Vegas Raiders with the 175th overall pick in the fifth round of the 2022 NFL Draft. He made his NFL debut in Week 3 of the 2022 season against the Tennessee Titans. He appeared in six games in his rookie season.

References

External links

 Las Vegas Raiders bio
Tennessee Volunteers bio

1999 births
Living people
Sportspeople from Fayetteville, North Carolina
Players of American football from North Carolina
American football defensive tackles
Tennessee Volunteers football players
Las Vegas Raiders players